The Furys were an American doo-wop group of the 1960s featuring tenors Tony Allen and Jimmy Green with baritone Jerome Evans. They were best known for a cover of "Zing! Went the Strings of My Heart, produced by James McEachin, and their performance of Gene Pitney's “If I Didn't Have a Dime".

Discography
A: Another Fella / B: If There's A Next Time  Mack IV Records	114	1962 	 
A: Zing! Went The Strings Of My Heart / B: Never More Mack IV  	112	Dec 1962	 	 
A: Dolow / B: The Storm  Cedar Records Philadelphia] 301	1963	 	 
A: Cover Girl / B: Where My Money Goes  Aura Records 	395	1964	 	 
A: The Man Who Has Everything / B: Baby You Can Bet Your Boots Liberty Records	55692	Apr 1964	 	 
A: What Is Soul / B: I Lost My Baby Mack IV  118	Sep 1965	 	 
A: Just A Little Mixed Up / B: I'm Satisfied With You  Keymen Records 	K-104	1967

References

American musical groups
Doo-wop groups